Maia Sharp is a 2002 album by American singer-songwriter Maia Sharp. It was released on the Concord Jazz label and produced by Sharp, her father Randy Sharp, and Mark Addison. Randy Sharp co-wrote the track "Crimes of the Witness".

Reception
Writing for Allmusic, Ronnie D. Lankford, Jr. gave the album four stars out of five. He praised the songs' "strong sense of melody" as well as the album's musical arrangements and lyrics. He cited the track "One Good Reason" as a highlight, calling it "achingly beautiful". He called the album as a whole "a fine batch of songs, [...] fresh and pleasing."

Track listing
"Crimes of the Witness" (Sharp, Sharp) — 3:15
"Willing to Burn" (December, James, Sharp) — 3:55
"Long Way Home" (Sharp) — 4:32
"Sinners" (Georges, Sharp) — 4:08
"Crooked Crown" (Batteau, Sharp) — 3:53
"Lightning" (Rose, Sharp) — 4:23
"One Good Reason" (Ashton, Sharp) — 4:00
"Happiness" (Robin, Sharp) — 3:36
"Understudies" (Mondlock, Sharp) — 3:43
"Your Own Justice" (Sharp) — 4:13
"You Can't Lose Them All" (Richey, Sharp, Thorn) — 3:44
"Ghosts" (Sharp, Sharp) — 0:52

References

2002 albums
Maia Sharp albums
Concord Records albums